The LG G Pad 8.3 (also known as LG G Tab 8.3) is an  Android-based tablet computer produced and marketed by LG Electronics. It belongs to the LG G series, and was announced on 4 September 2013 and launched in November 2013. Unlike its predecessor which had an  screen, the G Pad 8.3 has a smaller  screen.

History 
The G Pad 8.3 was first announced on 31 August 2013. It was officially unveiled at the 2013 Mobile World Conference. At that time, LG confirmed that the G Pad 8.3 would be released worldwide in the fourth quarter (Q4) of 2013.

On 14 October 2013, the G Pad 8.3 was released in Korea for 550,000 won. It was later released to the US market on 15 November 2013 for US$349.99.

On 10 December 2013, a version of the G Pad 8.3 with stock Android 4.4 (similarly to one of its competitors, the Nexus 7) was released on Google Play Store.

Starting in March 2014, Verizon Wireless began offering a version of the G Pad 8.3 for Verizon's 4G/LTE network, known as the LG G Pad 8.3 LTE. It launched at $99.99 from March 6–10, and then was offered at $199.99—both with a two-year activation.  It was also available without a contract at $299.99.

Features
The G Pad 8.3 is released with Android 4.2.2 Jelly Bean. LG has customized the interface with its Optimus UI software. As well as apps from Google, including Google Play, Gmail and YouTube, it has access to LG apps such as QPair, QSlide, KnockOn, and Slide Aside.

The G Pad 8.3 has been available in four variants:
 LG G Pad 8.3 LTE (VK810) for the Verizon Wireless LTE network
 LG G Pad 8.3 Google Play Edition (V510) with Google apps and automatic updates
 LG G Pad 8.3 Black (V500 Black) for WiFi-only
 LG G Pad 8.3 White (V500 White) for WiFi-only
Internal storage is 16 GB, with a microSDXC card slot for expansion. It has an  WUXGA TFT screen with a resolution of 1920 by 1200 pixels. It has a 1.3 MP front camera without flash and 5.0 MP AF rear-facing camera, as well as the ability to record HD videos.

In April 2014, LG released Android 4.4.2 KitKat with some improvements to the UI and the browser, as well as some new graphical details such as the transparent status bar and the white indicators included with KitKat. In late June 2014, LG released the Android 4.4.4 KitKat update for the G Pad 8.3 Google Play Edition. In  April 2015 the GPE versions were updated to Android 5.0 Lollipop.

References

G Pad 8.3
Android (operating system) devices
Tablet computers
Tablet computers introduced in 2013